George Petrovich Bakhmeteff (Russian: Георгий Петрович Бахметев; 1847 – 29 August 1928) was the last tsarist Russian Ambassador to the United States. He served in office between the years 1911 and 1917.

Origins
He was a career diplomat who descended from a Tatar noble family which had converted from Islam to the Russian Orthodox faith. Generations of the Bakhmeteff nobility had served under the Czars within the military and civil service. Previous to his service for Russia in Washington he had served as the Russian Ambassador to Japan.

Personal life

He was married to Mary Beale, the daughter of a popular Washington social couple Ambassador and Mrs. Edward Fitzgerald Beale. The Beales were the owners of Decatur House in Washington and Tejon Ranch. His brother in law was American Ambassador to the Balkans Truxtun Beale. His sister in law was Emily Beale McLean who was married to John Roll McLean publisher of the Washington Post. George Bakhmeteff was succeeded as ambassador by another Bakhmeteff; Boris Bakhmeteff who was not closely related.

He died on 29 August 1928 in Paris.

References

External links

 Marin County Historic Sites: Beale Mansion, San Rafael
 New York Times: Newport Social Season Report 1915

Ambassadors of the Russian Empire to Bulgaria
Ambassadors of the Russian Empire to the United States
Ambassadors of the Russian Empire to Japan
1847 births
1928 deaths